Patties Pies are a brand of meat pie created by Peter and Annie Rijs, in a bakery named "Patties" in Lakes Entrance, Victoria

The Patties Pie manufacturing plant in Bairnsdale, Victoria currently produces processed meat pie products such as Party 30 Pack, East Meets West Combo Pack and Patties Pie Bites

See also
Australian meat pie

References
Four'N Twenty
Bye-bye American pie, The Age, 21 July 2003

Australian brands
Brand name pies
Australian pies
Bakeries of Australia